Outside is a magazine focused on the outdoors. The first issue of the Outside magazine was published in September 1977. It is published by Outside Inc., a company that also owns various other ventures.

History
Outside founders were Jann Wenner (the first editor in chief), William Randolph Hearst III (its first managing editor), and Jack Ford (an assistant to founding publisher Donald Welsh and a son of former U.S. President Gerald Ford). Wenner sold Outside to Lawrence J. Burke two years later.
Burke merged it into his magazine Mariah (founded in 1976) and after a period of using the name Mariah/Outside kept the Outside name for the merged magazine. Christopher Keyes is the current editor.

Notable contributors
John Rasmus, the editor of Outside, launched the career of Jon Krakauer and other freelance travel and adventure writers. Though the magazine has tilted toward a more commercial aesthetic in recent years, it has also recruited figures from the literary world for freelance assignments. Writers whose work has appeared in Outside include Sebastian Junger, Bruce Barcott, Tim Cahill, Daniel Coyle, E. Annie Proulx, naturalist and author David Quammen, and Bob Shacochis. Songwriter David Berkeley also worked for Outside.

See also

Field and Stream
Outdoor Life
Sports Afield

References

Sports magazines published in the United States
Magazines established in 1977
Magazines published in New Mexico
Tourism magazines
Monthly magazines published in the United States
Mass media in Santa Fe, New Mexico
Mass media in Boulder, Colorado
Climbing magazines